HMS Discovery was a small ship, commissioned in 1741. She was commanded by Lieutenant William Moor as she accompanied the larger , commanded by his cousin, Christopher Middleton, on an expedition to Hudson's Bay, to search for the Northwest Passage.

Like many other vessels the Royal Navy used for exploration, Discovery was a converted collier. She displaced 150 tons.

References

Exploration ships of the United Kingdom
Ships of the Royal Navy